Statistics of League of Ireland in the 1975–76 season.

Overview
It was contested by 14 teams, and Dundalk won the championship.

Final classification

Albert Rovers were elected to the league for next season.

Results

Top scorers

Ireland, 1975-76
1975–76 in Republic of Ireland association football
League of Ireland seasons